New York's 58th State Assembly district is one of the 150 districts in the New York State Assembly. It has been represented by Monique Chandler-Waterman since 2022. She replaced 29-year Assemblyman N. Nick Perry, who was nominated as United States ambassador to Jamaica in 2022.

Geography
District 58 is in Brooklyn. The district includes parts of East Flatbush, Canarsie, and Brownsville.

Recent election results

2022

2022 special

2020

2018

2016

2014

2012

2010

References

58